Pakington is a surname, and may refer to:

 Dorothy Smith (Lady Pakington) (died 1639)
 Dorothy, Lady Pakington (1623–1679), English writer of religious works
 Sir Herbert Pakington, 5th Baronet (c. 1701 – 1748), English politician
 Herbert Stuart Pakington, 4th Baron Hampton (1883–1962)
 John Pakington (MP and Sheriff) (c. 1477 – 1551)
 John Pakington (died 1625), English courtier
 Sir John Pakington, 1st Baronet (1600–1624), English politician
 Sir John Pakington, 2nd Baronet (1621–1680), English politician 
 Sir John Pakington, 3rd Baronet (c. 1649 – 1688) 
 Sir John Pakington, 4th Baronet (1671–1727), English politician
 John Pakington, 1st Baron Hampton (1799–1880)
 Robert Pakington (c. 1489 – 1536), London merchant and Member of Parliament.
 Thomas Pakington (c. 1530 – 1571), English knight

See also
 Pakington family
 Pakington baronets

Surnames
English toponymic surnames